The siege of Pskov between 9 August and 27 October 1615 was the final battle of the Ingrian War. Swedish forces under Gustav II Adolf laid siege to Pskov, but were unable to take the city.

Prelude 

After the Battle of Klushino, the Swedish troops, located in Russia, called in 1609 by Vasily Shuisky, declared war on Russia and in 1611 occupied Novgorod Land. The siege of Tikhvin in 1613 was unsuccessful for the Swedes, but in 1614 they managed to take Gdov. In 1615 the Swedish King Gustavus Adolphus intended to subdue the Pskov land.

Siege 

Approaching Pskov, the Swedes tried to take it immediately, but were repelled by the Pskov garrison with heavy losses. In front of the king, famed field marshal Evert Horn was shot dead from the wall.  

During the siege, the Swedes shelled the city with artillery, but at night Pskovites successfully closed any breach in the walls, and repeatedly made bold sallies causing the Swedes considerable losses. In September, Pskov even received reinforcements from Moscow. 

In early October, the Swedes undertook a second decisive assault. The attackers managed to occupy part of the city wall and one of the towers. However, the Pskovites managed to blow up the tower, together with the Swedes that were in it, and went into a fierce counterattack. 

After two and a half months, the Swedes withdrew from Pskov to Narva in view of the coming cold weather, as well as the high mortality from diseases and famine.

Aftermath 
After a cruel defeat, King Gustavus Adolphus decided not to continue the war with Russia. Sweden already then planned to resume the struggle with Polish-Lithuanian Commonwealth for the Baltic states and was not ready for a war on two fronts. On December 15, 1615, a truce was concluded, and both parties initiated peace negotiations that ended with Treaty of Stolbovo in 1617.

References 

Pskov
Pskov(1615)
Pskov(1615)
1615 in Sweden
1610s in Sweden
1615 in Russia
Russia–Sweden military relations
History of Pskov